In geometry, the rhombitrioctagonal tiling is a semiregular tiling of the 
hyperbolic plane. At each vertex of the tiling there is one triangle and one octagon, alternating between two squares. The tiling has Schläfli symbol rr{8,3}. It can be seen as constructed as a rectified trioctagonal tiling, r{8,3}, as well as an expanded octagonal tiling or expanded order-8 triangular tiling.

Symmetry 
This tiling has [8,3], (*832) symmetry. There is only one uniform coloring.

Similar to the Euclidean rhombitrihexagonal tiling, by edge-coloring there is a half symmetry form (3*4) orbifold notation. The octagons can be considered as truncated squares, t{4} with two types of edges. It has Coxeter diagram , Schläfli symbol s2{3,8}. The squares can be distorted into isosceles trapezoids. In the limit, where the rectangles degenerate into edges, an order-8 triangular tiling results, constructed as a snub tritetratrigonal tiling, .

Related polyhedra and tilings 
From a Wythoff construction there are ten hyperbolic uniform tilings that can be based from the regular octagonal tiling.

Drawing the tiles colored as red on the original faces, yellow at the original vertices, and blue along the original edges, there are 8 forms.

Symmetry mutations
This tiling is topologically related as a part of sequence of cantellated polyhedra with vertex figure (3.4.n.4), and continues as tilings of the hyperbolic plane. These vertex-transitive figures have (*n32) reflectional symmetry.

See also 

 Rhombitrihexagonal tiling
 Order-3 octagonal tiling
 Tilings of regular polygons
 List of uniform tilings
 Kagome lattice

References
 John H. Conway, Heidi Burgiel, Chaim Goodman-Strass, The Symmetries of Things 2008,  (Chapter 19, The Hyperbolic Archimedean Tessellations)

External links 

 Hyperbolic and Spherical Tiling Gallery
 KaleidoTile 3: Educational software to create spherical, planar and hyperbolic tilings
 Hyperbolic Planar Tessellations, Don Hatch

Hyperbolic tilings
Isogonal tilings
Semiregular tilings